Liberec Zoo, (Zoologická zahrada Liberec) is a Czech zoo, located in Liberec in Czech Republic.

Liberec Zoo is the oldest zoo in the Czech Republic, founded in 1904, on the grounds of the winter quarters of a circus.

External links

References
Much of the content of this article comes from the equivalent Czech-language Wikipedia article.  Retrieved on 10 December 2014. Some of the following references are cited by that Czech-language article:

Zoos in the Czech Republic
Buildings and structures in Liberec
1904 establishments in Austria-Hungary
Zoos established in 1904